Skene is a census-designated place and unincorporated community located in Bolivar County, Mississippi, United States on Mississippi Highway 446. Skene was a station on the Boyle and Sunflower branch of the former Yazoo and Mississippi Valley Railroad.

A post office operated under the name Skene from 1902 to 1992.

It was first named as a CDP in the 2020 Census which listed a population of 210.

Demographics

2020 census

Note: the US Census treats Hispanic/Latino as an ethnic category. This table excludes Latinos from the racial categories and assigns them to a separate category. Hispanics/Latinos can be of any race.

Education
It is in the West Bolivar Consolidated School District. It was formerly in the Shaw School District. The Shaw district consolidated into the West Bolivar district in 2014.

The K-12 school for the Shaw area is McEvans K-12 School (merger of McEvans Elementary School and Shaw High School).

Notable people

 Chet Morgan  (1910–1991), Was an American baseball player and manager. He played Major League Baseball, principally for the Detroit Tigers.

References

Unincorporated communities in Bolivar County, Mississippi
Unincorporated communities in Mississippi
Census-designated places in Bolivar County, Mississippi